HMS Royal Sovereign was a 100-gun first-rate ship of the line of the Royal Navy, which served as the flagship of Admiral Collingwood at the Battle of Trafalgar. She was the third of seven Royal Navy ships to bear the name. She was launched at Plymouth Dockyard on 11 September 1786, at a cost of £67,458, and was the only ship built to her design. Because of the high number of Northumbrians on board the crew were known as the Tars of the Tyne.

Construction
Royal Sovereign was a 100-gun first rate ship of the line, designed by the John Williams (Surveyor of the Navy) in 1772.

Royal Sovereign was ordered on 3 February 1772 to be built at Plymouth Dockyard by the Master Shipwright Thomas Pollard. The long nature of her construction meant that the master shipwright changed twice, with Pownoll being replaced by John Henslow in February 1775, and Henslow in turn handing over to Thomas Pollard in November 1784. She measured 2,175  tons burthen. The fitting out process for Royal Sovereign was completed in September 1787, but she was still only partly fitted for sea.

In service
Royal Sovereign was part of Admiral Howe's fleet at the Glorious First of June, where she suffered 14 killed and 41 wounded.

On 16 June 1795, as the flagship of Vice-Admiral William Cornwallis, she was involved in the celebrated episode known as 'Cornwallis' Retreat'.

On 17 March 1796 the transport ship  collided with her and sank. Belisarius, Barge, master, was carrying troops and their dependents to the West Indies. Barge and about 110 persons were saved.

A witness on  wrote in a letter to The Observer newspaper that the accident was "occasioned by a dispute between the Master and the second Mate [of the Bellisarius] when wearing ship; by which, not paying proper attention, they fell athwart the Royal Sovereign, when the Sovereign's gib-boom and bowsprit took their main-mast, and struck her amid ship, by which she almost instantly sunk. To add to the distress of this dreadful scene, an unhappy woman, with her infant in her arms, who stood on the quarter-deck of the Bellisarius, attempted to save the life of her infant by throwing it on board the Royal Sovereign at the instant of the two ships meeting, but unfortunately it fell between the two ships sides, and was crushed to atoms before the eyes of its unhappy mother, who, in her distraction of mind, instantly precipitated herself into the sea, and shared the grave of her child."

Trafalgar
Under Admiral Collingwood she was the first ship of the fleet in action at Trafalgar on 21 October 1805, she led one column of warships; Nelson's  led the other. Due to the re-coppering of her hull prior to her arrival off Cádiz, Royal Sovereign was a considerably better sailer in the light winds present that day than other vessels, and pulled well ahead of the rest of the fleet. As she cut the enemy line alone and engaged the Spanish three decker , Nelson pointed to her and said, 'See how that noble fellow Collingwood carries his ship into action!' At approximately the same moment, Collingwood remarked to his captain, Edward Rotheram, 'What would Nelson give to be here?'

Royal Sovereign lost her mizzen and mainmasts, her foremast was badly damaged and much of her rigging was shot away. At about 2.20 pm Santa Ana finally struck her colours to Royal Sovereign.

Shortly afterwards a boat came from Victory carrying Lieutenant Hill, who reported that Nelson had been wounded. Realising that he might have to take command of the rest of the fleet and with his ship according to his report being "perfectly unmanageable", by 3 pm he signalled for the frigate  to take Royal Sovereign in tow. Euryalus towed her round to support the rest of the British ships with her port-side guns, and became engaged with combined fleet's van under Pierre Dumanoir le Pelley, as it came about to support the collapsing centre. Fire from the lead ships shot away the cable between Royal Sovereign and Euryalus, and the latter ship made off towards Victory. Royal Sovereign exchanged fire with the arriving ships, until Collingwood rallied several relatively undamaged British ships around Royal Sovereign, and Dumanoir gave up any attempt to recover some of the prizes, and made his escape at 4.30pm.

At 4.40 pm one of Victorys boats, carrying Captain Henry Blackwood and Lieutenant Hill, came alongside and Blackwood reported Nelson's death to Collingwood. This left Collingwood in command of the fleet, and with a storm rising, and disregarding Nelson's final order to bring the fleet to anchor, Collingwood ordered Blackwood to hoist the signal to all ships to come to the wind on the starboard tack, and to take disabled and captured ships in tow. Royal Sovereign was by now almost or totally unmanageable and virtually uninhabitable. As she had most of her masts shot away she could not make signals. Having his ship too much disabled by enemy fire at just before of 6 pm Collingwood, had to transfer himself and his flag to the frigate Euryalus, while Euryalus sent a cable across and took Royal Sovereign in tow for second time.
Royal Sovereign had lost one lieutenant, her master, one lieutenant of marines, two midshipman, 29 seamen, and 13 marines killed, and two lieutenants, one lieutenant of marines, one master's mate, four midshipman, her boatswain, 69 seamen, and 16 marines wounded.

After Trafalgar
Royal Sovereign returned to duty in the Mediterranean the next year and remained on the blockade of Toulon until November 1811, when she was ordered to return home to the Channel Fleet. In 1812 and 1813 she was under the command of Rear Admiral James Bissett serving under Admiral Keith.

She was credited with the capture on 5 August 1812 of the American ship Asia, of 251 tons, which had been sailing from St. Mary's to Plymouth with a cargo of timber. Royal Sovereign shared the proceeds of the capture with all the vessels in Keith's squadron, suggesting that what happened was that Asia sailed into Plymouth unaware that the War of 1812 between Britain and the United States had broken out and was seized as she arrived, the formal credit going to the flagship.

Fate

After her useful active life she was converted to harbour service as a receiving ship at Plymouth before being renamed HMS Captain on 17 August 1825. Hulked in June 1826, Captain was finally broken up at Plymouth, with work being completed on 28 August 1841. Four of her guns were saved and are incorporated in the Collingwood Monument in Tynemouth.

Notes, citations, and references
Notes

Citations

References

 
 
 
 
 James, William. (2003) The naval history of Great Britain from the declaration of war by France in 1793 to the accession of George IV, Conway Maritime Press Ltd. 
 Lavery, Brian (2003) The Ship of the Line – Volume 1: The development of the battlefleet 1650–1850. Conway Maritime Press. .
 Duke Yonge, Charles. The history of the British navy V2, from the earliest period to the present time R.Bentley Publishing. 
 San Juan, Victor. (2009) Trafalgar. Tres armadas en combate (Spanish Edition) (Kindle Edition) ASIN B00332FJT4
 Pocock, Tom. (2005) Trafalgar: An Eyewitness History. Penguin Best sellers. 
 Henry Newbolt. (2008) The Year Of Trafalgar Being An Account Of The Battle And Of The Events Which Led Up To It, With A Collection Of The Poems And Ballads Written Thereupon Between 1805 And 1905, Loney Press. 
 Michael Phillips. Royal Sovereign (100) (1786) (1). Michael Phillips' Ships of the Old Navy. Retrieved 2 September 2008.
 Michael Phillips. Royal Sovereign (100) (1786) (2). Michael Phillips' Ships of the Old Navy. Retrieved 2 September 2008.
 Lincoln P. Paine. Warships of the world to 1900 Mariner Books.

External links
 

Ships of the line of the Royal Navy
Ships built in Plymouth, Devon
1786 ships